David Alan Heyes (born 2 April 1946) is a British Labour Party politician and former Member of Parliament (MP) for Ashton-under-Lyne from 2001 to 2015.

Early life
Heyes was born in Blackley, Manchester and was educated at the Blackley Technical High School  on Dommett Street and was awarded a BA in Social sciences from the Open University in 1987. He joined Manchester City Council in 1962 as a local government officer, before joining Greater Manchester County Council in 1974. He was appointed as a principal local government officer with the Metropolitan Borough of Oldham Council in 1987, leaving local government employment in 1990 to set up as a graphic designer. In 1995 he was appointed deputy district manager of Manchester Citizens Advice Bureau where he remained until his election to parliament.

He has been a member of the trade union UNISON, and its predecessor the NALGO, since 1962. He was elected as a councillor in Oldham in 1992 and was secretary of the Labour group from 1993 to 2000; he stood down from the council in 2004.

Parliamentary career
Following the retirement of Ashton's veteran Labour MP Robert Sheldon at the 2001 General Election, he represented the seat in the House of Commons until 2015.

He has served as a member of the public administration select committee since 2001 and has fought for compensation for residents living alongside the M60 motorway.

Personal life
He is married to Judith Egerton-Gallagher, and they have a son and a daughter.

References

External links 
 The Labour Party - David Heyes MP official biography
 Guardian Unlimited Politics - Ask Aristotle: David Heyes MP
 TheyWorkForYou.com - David Heyes MP
 Blakes Parliamentary Yearbook
 BBC Politics 
 Interview with David Heyes in MP3 format, October 2009

Labour Party (UK) MPs for English constituencies
UK MPs 2001–2005
UK MPs 2005–2010
UK MPs 2010–2015
Councillors in Greater Manchester
Alumni of the Open University
Politicians from Manchester
1946 births
Living people
Members of the Parliament of the United Kingdom for Ashton-under-Lyne